Peter Lambert is a retired Irish sportsperson.  He played Gaelic football with his local club Ardfinnan and also with Cork team Nemo Rangers, and was a member of the Tipperary senior inter-county team from 1991 until 2003. He made his last appearance for Tipperary against Donegal in July 2003 in the 2003 All-Ireland qualifiers.

Lambert played with Cork club Nemo Rangers from 1991 to 1996 and won an  All-Ireland Senior Club Football Championship with them in 1994. In 2005 Lambert was player-manager as Ardfinnan won their first Tipperary Senior Football Championship since 1974 with a 1-5 to 1-4 win against Loughmore-Castleiney.

He also played with Munster in the Railway Cup in 1995, 1996, and was part of the winning team in 1999 that defeated Connacht 0-10 to 0-7 in the final.

Honours
Tipperary
McGrath Cup: 1	
 1993

Nemo Rangers
All-Ireland Senior Club Football Championship: 1
 1994
Munster Senior Club Football Championship: 1
 1993
Cork Senior Football Championship: 1
 1993

Ardfinnan
Tipperary Senior Football Championships: 1
 2005 (Player-Manager)

Munster
Railway Cup: 1
 1999

References

External links
Tipperary Record

Ardfinnan Gaelic footballers
Nemo Rangers Gaelic footballers
Tipperary inter-county Gaelic footballers
Munster inter-provincial Gaelic footballers
Living people
Year of birth missing (living people)
Place of birth missing (living people)